The 2018 New York Red Bulls season was the club's twenty-third season in Major League Soccer, the top division of soccer in the United States.

Team information

Squad information

Appearances and goals are career totals from all-competitions.

Roster transactions

In

Out

Draft picks

Preseason and Friendlies

Preseason

Major League Soccer season

Eastern Conference

Overall

Results summary

Matches

MLS Cup Playoffs

Conference semifinals

Conference Finals

CONCACAF Champions League

Round of 16

Quarter-finals

Semi-finals

U.S. Open Cup

New York entered the 2018 U.S. Open Cup with the rest of Major League Soccer in the fourth round.

Player statistics

As of 29 November 2018.

|-
! colspan="14" style="background:#dcdcdc; text-align:center"| Goalkeepers

|-
! colspan="14" style="background:#dcdcdc; text-align:center"| Defenders

|-
! colspan="14" style="background:#dcdcdc; text-align:center"| Midfielders

|-
! colspan="14" style="background:#dcdcdc; text-align:center"| Forwards

|-
! colspan="14" style="background:#dcdcdc; text-align:center"| Left Club During Season

Top scorers

As of 29 November 2018.

Assist Leaders

As of 29 November 2018.
This table does not include secondary assists.

Shutouts 

As of 29 November 2018.

Disciplinary record 

As of 29 November 2018.

References

New York Red Bulls
New York Red Bulls
New York Red Bulls
New York Red Bulls seasons
New York
2018